Aslan Kazikovich Tautiyev (born 25 May 1990) is a Russian former football defender.

Club career
He played two seasons in the Russian Football National League for FC Volgar Astrakhan.

External links
 
 Career summary by sportbox.ru
 

1990 births
Sportspeople from Vladikavkaz
Living people
Russian footballers
Association football defenders
FC Volgar Astrakhan players
FC Chernomorets Novorossiysk players
FC Sokol Saratov players
FC Chayka Peschanokopskoye players